Hypostomus niceforoi is a species of suckermouth armored catfish. H. niceforoi reaches 13.5 cm (5.3 inches) SL and is believed to be a facultative air-breather.

Taxonomic history
This species was described by Henry Weed Fowler in 1943. Its type locality is Florencia, Colombia, in the Orteguaza River. Fowler placed the species in the genus Hemiancistrus. Isaäc J. H. Isbrücker transferred this species to Hypostomus in 1980.

Distribution
This species occurs in the Japurá River basin in South America. A fish labeled Hypostomus cf. niceforoi has been found in Nicaragua; it is thought their introduction to Lake Nicaragua as an invasive species is due to the aquarium trade. H. cf. niceforoi have also been found in the San Marcos River, Texas.

References

Further reading

 

niceforoi
Catfish of South America
Freshwater fish of Colombia
Fish described in 1943
Taxa named by Henry Weed Fowler